The Ezhuthachan Puraskaram is the highest literary honour is given by the Kerala Sahitya Akademi, Government of Kerala. The award is named after Thunchaththu Ezhuthachan, the father of the Malayalam language and consists of a cash prize of 5,00,000 and a citation. The prize money was enhanced by 50,000 in 2011. The award was instituted in 1993 and Sooranad Kunjan Pillai was its first recipient.

List of winners 
The following are the winners of the Ezhuthachan Puraskaram.

References 

Indian literary awards
Kerala Sahitya Akademi
Malayalam literary awards
Awards established in 1993
1993 establishments in Kerala